Jazz Loves Paris is an album by multi-instrumentalist and composer Buddy Collette recorded in early 1958 and released on the Specialty label in 1960.

Reception

The Allmusic review by Scott Yanow states: "Such melodies as "I Love Paris," "La Vie En Rose," "C'est Si Bon" and the "Song from 'Moulin Rouge" are given concise but swinging treatment on this likable date".

Track listing
 "I Love Paris" (Cole Porter) - 2:21
 "Pigalle" (Georges Konyn, Charles Newman, Georges Ulmer) - 2:29 
 "La Vie en Rose" (Édith Piaf, Louiguy) - 3:56
 "Darling, Je Vous Aime Beaucoup" (Anna Sosenko) - 2:45
 "Mam'selle" (Edmund Goulding, Mack Gordon) - 1:17
 "C'est si bon" (Henri Betti, André Hornez, Jerry Seelen) - 3:04
 "Domino" (Louis Ferrari, Jacques Plante) - 2:16
 "The Song from Moulin Rouge" (Georges Auric, William Engvick) - 2:33 		
 "The Last Time I Saw Paris" (Jerome Kern, Oscar Hammerstein II) - 4:37 		
 "Under Paris Skies" (Jean Dréjac, Hubert Giraud) - 2:29
 "Darling, Je Vous Aime Beaucoup" [alternate take] (Sosenko) - 3:27 Bonus track on CD reissue		
 "Mam'selle" [alternate take] (Goulding, Gordon) - 1:22 Bonus track on CD reissue 		
 "The Last Time I Saw Paris" [alternate take] (Kern, Hammerstein) - 4:39 Bonus track on CD reissue 		
 "La Vie en Rose"  [alternate take] (Piaf, Louiguy) - 3:34 Bonus track on CD reissue

Personnel
Buddy Collette - alto saxophone, tenor saxophone, flute, clarinet
Frank Rosolino - trombone
Howard Roberts - guitar
Red Mitchell - bass
Red Callender - tuba, bass
Bill Douglass  (tracks 1, 4, 5, 8, 9 & 11- 13), Bill Richmond  (tracks 2, 3, 6, 7, 10 & 14)  - drums

References

Buddy Collette albums
1960 albums
Albums recorded at Radio Recorders